Scott Perry may refer to:

Scott Perry (American football) (born 1954), American football player
Scott Perry (baseball) (1891–1959), baseball player
Scott Perry (basketball) (born 1963), NBA executive
Scott Perry (politician) (born 1962), U.S. congressman from Pennsylvania
Scott Perry, a character from the TV series Council of Dads